The National Rally group is a parliamentary group in the National Assembly of France including representatives of the National Rally and League of the South formed after the 2022 legislative election. The group has been chaired by Marine Le Pen since June 28, 2022.

List of presidents

Historical membership 

National Assembly (France)
Parliamentary groups in France
National Rally (France)